Cheeka is a town in Haryana, India. Located 30 km from nearest city Kaithal, it is a business hub of Haryana.

Demographics
 India census, Cheeka had a population of 50000. Males constitute 20,610 of the population and females 18,342 with 13% of the population is under 6 years of age. Cheeka has an average literacy rate of 75.18%, lower than the national average of 75.55%; with male literacy of 81.87% and female literacy of 67.75%.

Background
Cheeka is a big hub of businesses like rice mills and marble shops. Known as the marble city of Haryana, around 60 marble shops ply in the city. Cheeka grain market is one of the busiest markets of Haryana. Cheeka serves as a local trade hub serving the local residents as well as the people of nearby areas.

Education
The people of Cheeka have witnessed great changes in education in Cheeka over the years. There was a time when only Government schools were there to serve students of Cheeka. Now a lot of private schools have emerged in Cheeka. Unlike a decade ago, now parents are not worried about the education of their children. But still there is lack of teachers in science area. For higher education, DAV College and a government ITI are there to serve aspiring students. However students still prefer to approach nearby cities for higher education as Cheeka lacks centers of higher education.

However Cheeka has also produced IAS and IPS officers. A lot of students from Cheeka have qualified the prestigious exams like JEE and NEET.

Schools: The Indian Heights International School, GGSS School, GBSS School, DAV Sr Sec Public School, AV Vidyamandir Sr Sec Public School, Kohinoor International Academy, KS Grewal Sr Sec Public School, Mother's Pride Public School, Xavier's International School, SD School, Gyan Deep School, Green Fields Public.

Medical facilities
To serve the patients, many government and private hospitals ply in the city. Cheeka has a lot of medical facilities. But it lacks higher facilities such as a cardiac hospital, cancer hospital, etc. People have to approach cities like Kaithal and Patiala for higher medical facilities.

References

[Aditya Garg]
[Jatender Singh Jangra]
[Deepak Goyal]

Cities and towns in Kaithal district